John Richard Terwilliger (born December 14, 1957 in Albuquerque, New Mexico) is an American former competitive rower and Olympic silver medalist.

Olympian
Terwilliger qualified for the 1980 U.S. Olympic team but was unable to compete due to the 1980 Summer Olympics boycott. In 2007, he received one of 461 Congressional Gold Medals created especially for the spurned athletes. He was a member of the American men's eights team that won the silver medal at the 1984 Summer Olympics in Los Angeles, California.  Terwilliger also participated in the men's coxed fours at the 1988 Summer Olympics and placed 5th overall. He spent his college career rowing for Seattle Pacific University, where he was a member of that school's first crew to participate in a national regatta, the Dad Vail.

References

External links
 
 Seattle Pacific University athlete biography, from http://www.spufalcons.com/.

1957 births
Living people
American male rowers
Rowers at the 1984 Summer Olympics
Rowers at the 1988 Summer Olympics
Olympic silver medalists for the United States in rowing
Medalists at the 1984 Summer Olympics
World Rowing Championships medalists for the United States
Congressional Gold Medal recipients